Quarles & Brady LLP is a U.S. law firm with eleven offices nationwide. According to the National Law Journal's 2012 rankings, it is the 107th largest law firm in the United States, and the second-largest firm in the state of Wisconsin (after Foley & Lardner).  The firm also ranked 184th in profit per attorney on the 2010 AmLaw 200 survey.

History
Quarles & Brady was formed in 1892. In 2000, the firm merged with Streich Lang, a Phoenix, Arizona law firm.  After being known in Arizona as Quarles & Brady Streich Lang LLP, the firm shortened its name and is now uniformly known as Quarles & Brady LLP.

Practice areas
Quarles & Brady has practices in commercial litigation, product liability, environmental law, regulatory compliance, Corporate law & securities law, mergers & acquisitions, private equity, antitrust, tax law, intellectual property, and real estate.

Notable lawyers and alumni
Tony Earl, former Governor of Wisconsin
Ron Kind, U.S. Congressman who represented Wisconsin's 3rd congressional district from 1997-2023
Matt Flynn, former chair of the Democratic Party of Wisconsin and candidate for governor in 2018
Kwame Raoul, Illinois Attorney General, elected 2018.
David S. Ruder, Chairman of the US Securities and Exchange Commission (1987 to 1989)
 Dr. John Daniels Jr, Philanthropist, businessman and former  Chairman

References

External links
 Homepage
 Chambers and Partners USA profile
 Profile from LexisNexis Martindale-Hubbell

Law firms established in 1974
Law firms based in Milwaukee